Zoran Predin (born 16 June 1958) is a Slovenian singer-songwriter from Maribor. In the 1980s, he was the front man of the new wave rock band Lačni Franz. He also writes music for film, television, and theatre.

In the late 1990s and early 2000s, he went on several tours with the rock singers Pero Lovšin and Vlado Kreslin. Among others, they composed the anthem of the Slovenia national football team for the 2000 European Football Championship.

He has also been active in public life. In the late 1990s, he publicly supported the Liberal Democracy of Slovenia.

Solo discography 
Albums:
Svjedoci-Priče (1989)
Gate na glavo (1992)
Napad ljubezni (1994)
Mentol bonbon (1996)
Ljubimec iz omare (1998)
All-purpose lover (1999)
Tretji človek (2000)
Lovec na sanje (2001)
V živo gre zares (2002)
Praslovan MP3 (2002)
Strup za punce (2003)
Na krilih prvega poljuba (2003)
Žarnica za boljši jutri (2005)
Čas za malo nežnosti (2006)
Za šaku ljubavi (2007)
Pod srečno zvezdo (2008)
Inventura (2008)

References

External links

Official website

1958 births
Slovenian singer-songwriters
Yugoslav male singers
Musicians from Maribor
Living people
20th-century Slovenian male singers
Hayat Production artists
21st-century Slovenian male singers